Cyril Ayris is an author from Western Australia who has after a long career in journalism, written books with both topical and historical subjects.

Originally a journalist, he had won two Arthur Lovekin Prize in Journalism awards. He was a journalist with The West Australian newspaper in Perth His stories were at stages also carried in other newspapers.

Most items published by him after the 1990s, list his status as Cyril Ayris freelance.

His books include:
Fremantle Prison: A brief history (1985)
John Forrest: Man of legend (1986) 
C. Y. O'Connor: The man for the time (1996)
ANZACS at Gallipoli (1997)
All the Bull's men : No. 2 Australian Independent Company (2/2nd Commando Squadron) (1997)
Bob Marshall: My Life and Times
Duty done / Colin Russell Leith as told to Cyril Ayris.
Squadron-Leader Robert Milton MC : the man who stayed behind : a biography as told to Cyril Ayris.
A question of duty : a biography as told to Cyril Ayris / [by] Alan King.
Dave the brave / as told by Cyril Ayris (David Dicks) 
Leeuwin Lighthouse - A Brief History (1996) 
 A Heritage ingrained : a history of Co-operative Bulk Handling Ltd. 1933-2000 (1999)  
Gulf to Gulf - The Long Walk : Jeff Johnson, as told to Cyril Ayris (2009)

References

External links
Cyril Ayris Freelance website
WA Authors and Illustrators A

Historians from Western Australia
Living people
Journalists from Western Australia
1935 births